Thornton Rockliffe (5 July 1887 – 18 March 1961) was an Australian cricketer. He played one first-class match for Tasmania in 1909/10.

See also
 List of Tasmanian representative cricketers

References

External links
 

1887 births
1961 deaths
Australian cricketers
Tasmania cricketers
Cricketers from Tasmania